Guazú Cuá (Guaraní: Guasu Kua) is a village and distrito in Paraguay, located 14 kilometres south of Escobar.  Guazú Cuá is a small rural community of around 440 people. Guazú Cuá has a school that goes up to the 11th grade, a well run healthpost, a police station, a church, soccer field with lights for night-time games and its own bus line, Linea 10 GuasuKua.

Sources 
World Gazeteer: Paraguay – World-Gazetteer.com

Populated places in the Ñeembucú Department